Thomas Ingalsbe (born November 16, 1969) is an American former weightlifter. He competed in the men's super heavyweight event at the 1996 Summer Olympics.

References

External links
 

1969 births
Living people
American male weightlifters
Olympic weightlifters of the United States
Weightlifters at the 1996 Summer Olympics
Sportspeople from Marietta, Georgia
20th-century American people
21st-century American people